The 1998 Division Two Championship season was the third tier of British rugby league during the 1998 season.

Championship
The league was won by Lancashire Lynx. No teams were promoted, as the First and Second Divisions were merged to form a single division which would later become known as the Northern Ford Premiership.

League table

See also
Super League war
1998 Challenge Cup

References

External links

1998 season at wigan.rlfans.com

RFL League 1
RFL Division Two